Lee Do-gyeom is a South Korean actor and model. He is best known for his roles in dramas such as While You Were Sleeping, Solomon's Perjury and Your House Helper.

Filmography

Television series

Film

References

External links 
 
 
 

1990 births
Living people
21st-century South Korean male actors
South Korean male models
South Korean male television actors
South Korean male film actors